Archiceroptera is a genus of flies belonging to the family Lesser Dung flies.

Species
A. mahunkai Papp, 1977
A. venezolana (Richards, 1963)

References

Sphaeroceridae
Diptera of South America
Brachycera genera